The discography of David Gilmour, the lead guitarist of Pink Floyd, consists of four studio albums and six singles.

Albums

Studio albums

Live albums

Singles

Other appearances

Collaborations

Benefit groups

Video albums

Session and production work

Unreleased soundtracks 
Fractals: The Colours of Infinity, Documentary (1994)

References

Gilmour, David
David Gilmour